The Sculptor Galaxy (also known as the Silver Coin, Silver Dollar Galaxy, NGC 253, or Caldwell 65) is an intermediate spiral galaxy in the constellation Sculptor. The Sculptor Galaxy is a starburst galaxy, which means that it is currently undergoing a period of intense star formation.

Observation

Observational history
The galaxy was discovered by Caroline Herschel in 1783 during one of her systematic comet searches. About half a century later, John Herschel observed it using his 18-inch metallic mirror reflector at the Cape of Good Hope. He wrote: "very bright and large (24′ in length); a superb object.... Its light is somewhat streaky, but I see no stars in it except 4 large and one very small one, and these seem not to belong to it, there being many near..."

In 1961, Allan Sandage wrote in the Hubble Atlas of Galaxies that the Sculptor Galaxy is "the prototype example of a special subgroup of Sc systems....photographic images of galaxies of the group are dominated by the dust pattern. Dust lanes and patches of great complexity are scattered throughout the surface. Spiral arms are often difficult to trace.... The arms are defined as much by the dust as by the spiral pattern." Bernard Y. Mills, working out of Sydney, discovered that the Sculptor Galaxy is also a fairly strong radio source.

In 1998, the Hubble Space Telescope took a detailed image of NGC 253.

Amateur
As one of the brightest galaxies in the sky, the Sculptor Galaxy can be seen through binoculars and is near the star Beta Ceti. It is considered one of the most easily viewed galaxies in the sky after the Andromeda Galaxy.

The Sculptor Galaxy is a good target for observation with a telescope with a 300 mm diameter or larger. In such telescopes, it appears as a galaxy with a long, oval bulge and a mottled galactic disc. Although the bulge appears only slightly brighter than the rest of the galaxy, it is fairly extended compared to the disk. In 400 mm scopes and larger, a dark dust lane northwest of the nucleus is visible, and over a dozen faint stars can be seen superimposed on the bulge.

Features

The Sculptor Galaxy is located at the center of the Sculptor Group, one of the nearest groups of galaxies to the Milky Way. The Sculptor Galaxy (the brightest galaxy in the group and one of the intrinsically brightest galaxies in the vicinity of ours, only surpassed by the Andromeda Galaxy and the Sombrero Galaxy) and the companion galaxies NGC 247, PGC 2881, PGC 2933, Sculptor-dE1, and UGCA 15 form a gravitationally-bound core near the center of the group. Most other galaxies associated with the Sculptor Group are only weakly gravitationally bound to this core.

Starburst
NGC 253's starburst has created several super star clusters on NGC 253's center (discovered with the aid of the Hubble Space Telescope): one with a mass of 1.5*106 solar masses, and absolute magnitude of at least −15, and two others with  solar masses and absolute magnitudes around −11; later studies have discovered an even more massive cluster heavily obscured by NGC 253's interstellar dust with a mass of  solar masses, an age of around  years, and rich in Wolf-Rayet stars. The super star clusters are arranged in an ellipse around the center of NGC 253, which from the Earth's perspective appears as a flat line.

Star formation is also high in the northeast of NGC 253's disk, where a number of red supergiant stars can be found, and in its halo there are young stars as well as some amounts of neutral hydrogen. This, along with other peculiarities found in NGC 253, suggest that a gas-rich dwarf galaxy collided with it 200 million years ago, disturbing its disk and starting the present starburst.

As happens in other galaxies suffering strong star formation such as Messier 82, NGC 4631, or NGC 4666, the stellar winds of the massive stars produced in the starburst as well as their deaths as supernovae have blown out material to NGC 253's halo in the form of a superwind that seems to be inhibiting star formation in the galaxy.

Although supernovae are generally associated with starburst galaxies, only one supernova has been detected within the Sculptor Galaxy. The supernova, named SN 1940E, is located approximately 54″ southwest of the galaxy's nucleus. It was discovered in November 1940.

Central black hole
Research suggests the presence of a supermassive black hole in the center of this galaxy with a mass estimated to be 5 million times that of the Sun, which is slightly heavier than Sagittarius A*.

Distance estimates
At least two techniques have been used to measure distances to Sculptor in the past ten years.

Using the planetary nebula luminosity function method, an estimate of 10.89  million light years (or Mly; 3.34  Megaparsecs, or Mpc) was achieved in 2006.

The Sculptor Galaxy is close enough that the tip of the red-giant branch (TRGB) method may also be used to estimate its distance. The estimated distance to Sculptor using this technique in 2004 yielded 12.8 ± 1.2 Mly (3.94 ± 0.37 Mpc).

A weighted average of the most reliable distance estimates gives a distance of 11.4 ± 0.7 Mly (3.5 ± 0.2 Mpc).

Satellite
An international team of researchers has used the Subaru Telescope to identify a faint dwarf galaxy disrupted by NGC 253. The satellite galaxy is called NGC 253-dw2 and may not survive its next passage by its much larger host. The host galaxy may suffer some damage too if the dwarf is heavy enough. The interplay between the two galaxies is responsible for the disturbation in NGC 253's structure.

See also
 Globular cluster NGC 288, located 1°.8 south-southeast of the Sculptor Galaxy.
 2MASX J00482185-2507365 occulting pair, discovered while photographing NGC 253

References

External links

 STScI news release: Hubble Probes the Violent Birth of Stars in Galaxy NGC 253
 STScI news release: Behind a Dusty Veil Lies a Cradle of Star Birth

 SEDS – NGC 253

Starburst galaxies
Intermediate spiral galaxies
Sculptor (constellation)
Sculptor Group
NGC objects
02789
065b
17830923
UGCA objects
Discoveries by Caroline Herschel